William Roderick Blevin AM DSc FAA FTSE FAIP FIP (31 October 1929, Inverell, New South Wales – 11 August 2022) was an Australian physicist. He was elected a Fellow of the Australian Academy of Science in 1985 and appointed a Member of the Order of Australia in 1989.

Blevins died on 11 August 2022, aged 92.

References

1929 births
2022 deaths
Fellows of the Australian Academy of Science
Australian physicists
Members of the Order of Australia
Recipients of the Centenary Medal
People from Inverell